The Aeros Virtuoso is a Ukrainian single-place, paraglider that was designed and produced by Aeros of Kyiv.

Design and development
The Virtuoso was intended as an intermediate paraglider and was AFNOR certified as "standard". The aircraft was in production in 2003, but is no longer available. The variant number indicates the wing area in square metres.

Variants
Virtuoso 25
AFNOR certified.
Virtuoso 27
AFNOR certified.
Virtuoso 30
AFNOR certified.

Specifications (Virtuoso 25)

References

Paragliders
Virtuoso